Loum is a city located in the Littoral Region of Cameroon.

See also
Communes of Cameroon

References

Populated places in Littoral Region (Cameroon)